The colour wheel theory of love is an idea created by the Canadian psychologist John Alan Lee that describes six love styles, using several Latin and Greek words for love. First introduced in his book Colours of Love: An Exploration of the Ways of Loving (1973), Lee defines three primary, three secondary, and nine tertiary love styles, describing them in the traditional colour wheel. The three primary types are Eros, Ludus, and Storge, and the three secondary types are Mania, Pragma, and Agape.

Primary types of love

Eros 
Eros is the Greek term for romantic, passionate, or sexual love, from which the term erotic is derived. Lee describes Eros as a passionate physical and emotional love feeling of wanting to satisfy, create sexual contentment, security, and aesthetic enjoyment for each other, it also includes creating sexual security for the other by striving to forsake options of sharing one's intimate and sexual self with outsiders. It is a highly sensual, intense, passionate style of love. Erotic lovers choose their lovers by intuition or "chemistry". They are more likely to say they fell in love at first sight than those of other love styles.

Erotic lovers view marriage as an extended honeymoon, and sex as the ultimate aesthetic experience. They tend to address their lovers with pet names, such as "sweetie" or "sexy". An erotic lover can be perceived as a "hopeless romantic". The erotic lover wants to share and know everything about their loved one and often thinks of their partner in an idealized manner. The erotic lover's reaction to criticism from their partner is one of hurt and intense pain. The erotic lover's reaction to separation from the partner is agony and despair. Those of other love styles may see erotic lovers as unrealistic, or trapped in a fantasy.

The advantage of erotic love is that the hormones and emotions cause lovers to bond with each other, and feelings of lust and feelings of love alternatively reinforce each other. It is very relaxing for the person doing it. It affords a sense of security to both partners who recognize and see sexual complementation in each other and a sense of life's purpose. Sexual contentment lies at the bottom of Maslow's hierarchy of needs along with hunger and shelter. It requires both partners to accord validity to each other's sexual feelings, work on sustaining interest and maintain the sexual health of the relationship. A disadvantage is the possibility of the decay in attraction and the danger of living in a fantasy world. In its extreme, Eros can resemble naivety. A partner not as sexually inclined may also feel one's physical body being taken for granted and may perceive the Eros lover as looking for carnal gratification.

Examples of Eros may be seen in movies including The Blue Lagoon, Return to the Blue Lagoon, Pretty Woman, Working Girl, and Girl with a Pearl Earring.

Lee's recognizable traits:
 Feels strong physical and emotional connection through the relationship.
 Begins with a partner who is a stranger and evokes immediate excitement.
 May be exclusive but not possessive.
 Seeks early sexual adventure, variety and technique.
 Is ready for love and its risks.

Ludus 
Ludus means "game" or "school" in Latin. Lee uses the term to describe those who see love as a desire to want to have fun with each other, to do activities indoor and outdoor, tease, indulge, and play harmless pranks on each other. The acquisition of love and attention itself may be part of the game.

Ludic lovers want to have as much fun as possible. When they are not seeking a stable relationship, they rarely or never become overly involved with one partner and often can have more than one partner at a time, in other words, a school of partners. They do not reveal their true thoughts and feelings to their partner(s), especially if they think they can gain some kind of advantage over their partner(s). The expectation may also be that the partner(s) should also be similarly minded. If a relationship materializes it will be about having fun and indulging in activities of varying degrees of learnedness together.
This love style carries the likelihood of infidelity. In its most extreme form, ludic love can become sexual addiction.

Examples of Ludus in movies include Dangerous Liaisons, Cruel Intentions, and Kids.

Storge 

Storge is the Greek term for familial love. Lee defines Storge as growing slowly out of friendship and based more on similar interests and a commitment to one another rather than on passion. However, he chooses Storge, rather than the term Philia (the usual term for friendship) to describe this kind of love.

There is a love between siblings, spouses, cousins, parents, and children. Storge necessitates certain familial loyalties, responsibilities, duties, and entitlements. The dwelling is to be a sanctuary for its members and all members of a family are to pull through together in difficult times. Except for marriage, all other relationships have existed often by blood for as long as the individuals have known each other. In marriage, a couple, who formerly did not accord each other this love, promises to extend and build this love and form a new bond of kinship. Family members hold each other in good esteem to the outside world. Insults undermine the connected family reputations. In many judicial systems, a family member cannot be asked to testify in court against a member of one's immediate family for a crime external to the family. Storgic love often develops gradually out of friendship, or out of extended duration of cohabitation. The friendship in some cases can endure beyond the breakup of the relationship.

Examples of Storge can be seen in movies including Love & Basketball, When Harry Met Sally..., and Zack and Miri Make a Porno.

Lee's recognizable traits:
 Is not looking for love but is ready if encountered.
 Quietly possessive but not overly jealous.
 Believes love comes from friendship but not a goal of life.
 Only has sexual desires after commitment is declared.

Secondary types of love 
According to Lee's colour wheel theory, there are three secondary types of love: mania, agape, and pragma.

Mania 

Mania is derived from the Ancient Greek term , meaning "mental disorder", from which the term "manic" is derived. Lee defines Manic love as flowing out of a desire to hold one's partner in high esteem and wanting to love and be loved in this way, seeing specialness in the interaction. This type of love tends to lead a partner into a type of madness and obsessiveness. On the colour wheel, it is represented by the colour purple, since it is a mix between Ludus and Eros.

Manic lovers speak of their partners with possessives and superlatives, and they feel that they "need" their partners. Oftentimes, manic individuals are attracted to individuals who have low self-esteem and a weak self-concept. This kind of love is expressed as a means of rescue, or reinforcement of value. Manic lovers value finding a partner through chance without prior knowledge of their financial status, education, background, or personality traits. Insufficient expression of Manic love by one's partner can cause one to perceive the partner as aloof, materialistic, and detached. In excess, mania becomes obsession or codependency, and obsessed manic lovers can thus come across as being very possessive and jealous. One example from real life can be found in the case of John Hinckley, Jr., an individual suffering from mental illness, who attempted to assassinate the incumbent US President Ronald Reagan due to a delusion that this would prompt the actress Jodie Foster to finally reciprocate his obsessive love.

Extreme examples of mania in popular culture include yandere anime and manga characters. Additionally, Manic love is a central theme in the films Endless Love, Fatal Attraction, Misery, Play Misty for Me, Swimfan, and Taxi Driver.

Lee's recognizable traits:
 Anxiety about falling in love, with expectations of pain
 Quickly becoming overwhelmed by thoughts of one's partner
 Forcing a partner into showing affection and emotion
 Easily frustrated and does not enjoy sexual intimacy
 Possessiveness and jealousy

Agape 

Agape is derived from ἀγάπη, an Ancient Greek term for altruistic love. Lee describes agape as an altruistic love, given by the lover who sees it as his obligation without expecting reciprocity. According to Lee, Agapic lovers are usually older and more emotionally mature, thus a love guided by will and reason than emotion or attraction. Agape is a combination of Storge and Eros. 

Agape is an all-giving, selfless love. A revised questionnaire based on an instrument in a previous study (Hendrick et al., 1984) entitled Altitude about sex and love was administered to a group of Psychology students. Results showed that Agapic lovers are willing to place their lover’s happiness and needs before their own and endure all suffering and all things for the sake of their lover. Whatever they own is their lover's and no argument or strife will change that unconditional love. Agape love is often referenced with religious meaning and is signified by the colour orange.

Agapic lovers view their partners as blessings and wish to take care of them. The Agapic lover gets more pleasure from giving in a relationship than from receiving. They will remain faithful to their partners to avoid causing them pain and often wait patiently for their partners after a break-up. Agape requires one to be forgiving, patient, understanding, loyal, and willing to make sacrifices for their partner. An Agapic lover believes that this love is unconditional, though lovers taking an Agapic stance on relationships risk suffering from inattention to their own needs. The advantage of Agapic love is its generosity. A disadvantage is that it can induce feelings of guilt or incompetence in a partner. There is the potential to be taken advantage of. In its deviant form, agape can become Martyrdom.  For principle, martyrdom for principle may be acceptable; martyrdom to maintain a relationship is considered psychologically unhealthy.

Examples of agape can be found in books and movies including The Gift of the Magi by O. Henry, Penelope in Homer's Odyssey, The Mission, Somewhere in Time, Titanic, Untamed Heart, Forrest Gump, and the Bible. 

Lee's recognizable traits:
 Attracted to several types of people
 Meets people easily so most likely will begin with a stranger
 Feels concern and care for each partner they have
 Is neither jealous nor obsessive
 Enjoys sex and is willing to improve it

Pragma 
Pragma comes from the Ancient Greek term , meaning 'businesslike', from which terms like pragmatic are derived.
Lee defines pragma as the most practical type of love, not necessarily derived out of true romantic love. Rather, pragma is a convenient type of love.

Pragmatic lovers have a notion of being of service which they perceive to be rational and realistic. While they may be sincere about being useful themselves it also translates to having expectations of a partner and of the relationship. They tend to select and reject partners based on what they perceive as desirable, compatible traits. Pragmatic lovers want to find value in their partners, and ultimately want to work with their partners to reach a common goal. The practicality and realism of pragmatic love often contribute to the longevity of the relationship, as long as common goals and values remain shared for the duration. Excessive thinking along these lines causes a relationship to be seen for its utility or as a trade or exchange. The attitude of a pragmatic relationship can become disdainful and toxic if one partner sees the other as a burden. The emphasis within pragmatic relationships is on earning, affordability, child care, and/or home service. Pragmatic love as a form of cooperation or symbiosis should not be considered negative. In a collectivist culture where arranged marriage is practiced, pragmatic love is very common (Chaudhuri, 2004). Values are likely to be shared by a couple in developing countries, where survival and the building of wealth are often prioritized over other pursuits.

Examples of Pragma can be found in books, movies, and TV including Ordinary People, Pride and Prejudice (Charlotte), Little Women (Amy March and Fred Vaughn) and House of Cards (Frank and Claire Underwood). Political marriages are also considered to be examples of pragmatic love.

Lee's recognizable traits:
 Certain of their preferable "types".
 Begins a relationship with an already familiar person.
 Believes a loving relationship is desirable for a happy life.
 Expects reciprocation of feelings.
 Believes sexual compatibility can be worked out.

Tertiary types of love 
Lee defines nine types of tertiary types of love that are combinations of the previous six types of love. Each combination includes one primary and one secondary. 
 Manic eros
 Manic ludus
 Manic storge
 Agapic eros
 Agapic ludus
 Agapic storge
 Pragmatic eros
 Pragmatic ludus
 Pragmatic storge

Though Lee names each of the tertiary types of love, he never found enough evidence to distinguish them fully.

Measurement
Clyde Hendrick and Susan Hendrick of Texas Tech University expanded on this theory in the mid-1980s with their extensive research on what they called "love styles". Their study found that male students tend to be more ludic, whereas female students tend to be Storgic and Pragmatic. Whilst the Ludic love style may predominate in men under age thirty, studies on more mature men have shown that the majority of them do indeed mature into desiring monogamy, marriage, and providing for their family by age thirty.

Hendrick and Hendrick (1986) developed a self-report questionnaire measure of Lee's love styles, known as the Love Attitudes Scale (LAS). A shortened version of the LAS, presumably for researchers trying to keep their surveys as concise as possible, was later published, and other variations appear to have been used by some researchers. Respondents indicate their level of agreement or disagreement with the LAS items, examples of which include "My partner and I have the right physical 'chemistry'" (eros) and "Our love is the best kind because it grew out of a long friendship" (storge).  Depending on the version of the LAS one administers, there are from 3 to 7 items for each of the six styles described above. A 2002 article illustrated the use of the LAS.

Biological view
In 2007, researchers from the University of Pavia led by Dr Enzo Emanuele provided evidence of a genetic basis for individual variations in Lee's love styles, with Eros being linked to the dopamine system and mania to the serotonin system. In this genetic study of 350 lovers, the Eros style was found to be present more often in those bearing the TaqI A1 allele of the DRD2 3' UTR sequence and the overlapping ANKK1 exon 8. This allele has been proposed to influence a wide range of behaviors, favoring obesity and alcoholism but opposing neuroticism-anxiety and juvenile delinquency.    This genetic variation has been hypothesized to cause a reduced amount of pleasure to be obtained from a given action, causing people to indulge more frequently.

See also 

 Diotima of Mantinea
 The Four Loves by C. S. Lewis
 Theories of love
 Triangular theory of love
 Greek words for love
 Love

References

External links 
 http://www.psychologycharts.com/six-love-styles.html
 http://www.intropsych.com/ch16_sfl/six_types_of_love.html
 https://web.archive.org/web/20160615202623/http://www.rv337.com/vimages/shared/vnews/stories/4b55e440aa0d7/John%20Lee's%20Love%20Theory.pdf

Philosophy of love